Arizona State Route 143, also known as SR 143 and the Hohokam Expressway, is a north–south and access-controlled freeway in Maricopa County, Arizona, that runs from a junction with Interstate 10 at 48th Street in Phoenix to McDowell Road. The only other major junction along the  route is with Loop 202, which is located one half-mile south of McDowell Road and the northern terminus.

The road lies directly to the east of Phoenix Sky Harbor International Airport. Along with the Sky Harbor Expressway (former SR 153), SR 143's primary purpose is to provide East Valley residents with access to Sky Harbor from westbound Interstate 10 and US 60. This removes the need to travel longer on frequently congested I-10 and avoid the junction with Interstate 17's southern terminus.

Route description 
The Hohokam Expressway begins at an intersection with McDowell Road in Phoenix. The freeway continues southward to an ornately designed junction with the Red Mountain portion of Loop 202. Commuters are then allotted access to Sky Harbor International Airport prior to the Salt River crossing.

The southern half of SR 143 begins with the original interchange with University Drive, and then one with Interstate 10 and US 60. After these two interchanges, the freeway ends by transitioning into 48th Street, a surface street.

History

The Hohokam Expressway has a long history and gestation period. The road was first planned in 1957 as SR 143 as part of the 1960 Phoenix Freeway plan as a collector road for traffic from the east side of Phoenix, as well as a proposed eastern exit from Sky Harbor Airport. The present-day interchange with Interstate 10 was for 48th Street, completed in 1967 as part of the original I-10 freeway construction through the southeast sections of the valley such as the Tempe and Chandler suburbs.

The final design was released in 1974, when SR 143 was not yet a freeway, but a parkway with traffic signals and intersections. The design portrayed the new parkway leaving Interstate 10 north along 48th Street corridor, then angling across the Salt River to reach 44th Street where it was planned to end at Washington St. When it opened in 1978, it included the vital eastern access to Sky Harbor Airport, replacing the old 40th Street entrance that was eliminated when 40th Street was demolished to make way for a new airport terminal and runway expansions.

The new parkway rapidly earned a reputation as a constantly congested road, despite having only three traffic signals. As an attempt at decreasing congestion, a grade-separated interchange at University Drive was built in 1985.  The bridge was built to handle two lanes of traffic in each direction though without a shoulder or emergency lane. (This has been identified as a reason of the traffic backups still seen today, as the rest of the freeway is now built to three lanes on either side, thus creating a bottleneck at the University Drive overpass.)

In 1985, the route was surveyed as part of the new Maricopa Association of Governments 1985 Freeway Plan, and was added to the system with a reroute and upgrade to freeway status. Business Loop I-10 was renamed to SR 143 and was realigned to meet up with the under-construction Loop 202 at 48th Street, as opposed to the old 44th Street alignment. Eventually the route from Sky Harbor Blvd. to Loop 202 was moved onto an entirely new path along the Old Cross Cut Canal right-of-way, roughly paralleling 46th St. beginning at Washington St. Draft plans also included extending the route 2 miles further north along the relatively narrow 48th Street/canal corridor, curving over McDowell Rd. and ending abruptly at Indian School Rd. The route, which is almost entirely residential, met with significant neighborhood opposition and was eventually dropped, although the north-bound exit and south-bound entrance at McDowell Rd. was retained.

Construction timeline
 February 1991: University Drive to Sky Harbor Boulevard
 November 1991: Sky Harbor Boulevard to Washington Street
 February 1992: Washington Street to McDowell Road
 January 2011: Major interchange improvements at Loop 202
 2021-2024: Interchange improvements as a part of the I-10/Broadway Curve expansion

Safety concerns
At the southern terminus of the freeway, SR 143 begins at the intersection of 48th Street and Broadway, climbing over Interstate 10 on the original 48th Street bridge built without any shoulder lanes in 1967. Traffic heading southbound at this point is warned of a traffic signal that hides over the optical horizon of the overpass to most traffic. To combat safety issues raised by the lack of visibility of the main traffic signals, a second traffic signal was installed at a higher elevation so that it is visible to traffic on the northern approach of the overpass. At one point, the second signal included a high-intensity strobe embedded in the red signal; however, the strobe has since been removed. In addition to the strobing signal light, rumble strips have been cut into the bridge deck at several intervals, and there is a sign that turns on if the signal is red and the speed limit is reduced, further alerting traffic that the freeway is ending.

Part of the bridge deck is shared with an exit-only lane leading to a cloverleaf ramp to Interstate 10/US 60 Eastbound to Tucson, which has a ramp speed limit of only  to access the freeway. Traffic is frequently backed up to University Drive from this exit, and has raised additional safety concerns of the intersection and highway junction. Also, the Broadway Road intersection is less than one quarter mile south of I-10. Traffic is currently backing up from that intersection to I-10, causing further delays and potential accidents due to the visibility and design of the bridge over I-10. ADOT is currently studying the redesign of the southern section of SR 143, including the infamous bridge, to the Sky Harbor Airport exit in an attempt to fix the numerous safety issues with the addition of collector-distributor lanes when the freeway is widened in the near future. C/D lanes are also known to split a freeway into "local" and "express" lanes. Because SR 143 connects the Red Mountain Freeway (Loop 202) to Interstate 10, this route is popular with local commuters seeking to bypass a stretch of Interstate 10 and US 60 between the Mini Stack and the Broadway Curve, adding to additional traffic overload and safety issues at the interchange with SR 143/I-10/US 60. The speed limit on I-10 throughout the city of Phoenix is currently .

Exit list

References

External links

 SR 143 Construction Projects

See also
 Hohokam
 Sky Harbor International Airport
 List of Arizona State Routes
 Arizona State Route 153 (a highway that used to run immediately parallel to SR 143, carrying some adjacent traffic)

143
143
Transportation in Maricopa County, Arizona
Interstate 10
Transportation in Tempe, Arizona